Pressure wave may refer to:

 P-wave, one of the two main types of elastic body waves, called seismic waves in seismology
 Mechanical longitudinal waves, also called compressional or compression waves